Central Sumba Regency is a regency in East Nusa Tenggara of Indonesia. The new Central Sumba Regency was established on the island of Sumba when West Sumba Regency was split into two regencies on 22 May 2007 and a further Regency was created in Central Sumba from parts of both West Sumba and East Sumba Regencies.
The new Regency covers 1,869.18 km2 and had a population of 62,485 at the 2010 Census and 85,482 at the 2020 Census; the official estimate as at mid 2021 was 87,630. The seat (capital) of its government is located at Waibakul.

Administrative Districts 

The Central Sumba Regency (following the re-organisation of 22 May 2007 which created it out of parts of both West Sumba Regency and East Sumba Regency) was composed of five districts (kecamatan), but a sixth district (Umbu Ratu Nggay Tengah) has been created by taking 7 villages from Umbu Ratu Nggay District and 3 villages from West Umbu Ratu Nggay District. The areas (in km2) and populations of these districts at the 2010 Census  and the 2020 Census are listed below, together with the official estimates as at mid 2021. The table also includes the locations of the district administrative centres, the number of administrative villages (rural desa and urban kelurahan) in each district, and its postal code.

Note: (a) This area has subsequently been reduced by the creation of the new Central Umbu Nggay District.

References

See also 

 List of regencies and cities of Indonesia

Regencies of East Nusa Tenggara